Pierre Lavertu (born May 11, 1990) is a former Canadian football offensive lineman who played for the Calgary Stampeders of the Canadian Football League (CFL). He was drafted by the Stampeders with the first overall pick in the 2014 CFL Draft. He played CIS football at Laval University.

College career
Lavertu played football for the Laval Rouge et Or. He was a four-time Quebec conference All-Star and a three-time CIS All-Canadian. He was a member of the Rouge et Or’s Vanier Cup-winning teams in 2010, 2012 and 2013.

Professional career
Lavertu was drafted by the Calgary Stampeders with the first pick in the 2014 CFL Draft. He signed with the Stampeders on May 29, 2014. He made his CFL debut on June 28, 2014 against the Montreal Alouettes. Lavertu played for four seasons in the CFL, spending the 2017 season on injured reserve before announcing his retirement in April 2018. Lavertu played in 41 games in his three active seasons, but was hampered by injuries in 2016 and then missed all of 2017. After consulting with doctors he determined he would not be able to play at the level he expected of himself, and thus announced his decision to retire from professional football.

References

External links
Calgary Stampeders bio 

Living people
1990 births
Calgary Stampeders players
Canadian football offensive linemen
Laval Rouge et Or football players
Players of Canadian football from Quebec
Sportspeople from Quebec City